Kaunri Kanya (English: Possessed Girl) is the first 3D Oriya horror film, directed by debutant director Soumya Ranjan Sahu. The film stars several debutant actors. The film was also dubbed into Tamil. It is the first Oriya film to feature an underwater sequence which was shot in Vizag. While most of the shooting happened in Surangi, Ganjam, Odisha, the background score and music were done by South Indian artists Satya and Mithun. Prakruti Mishra gives a special appearance in the film.

The movie is based around the story of a doctor whose wife becomes possessed by an evil spirit. This film explores social stigmas viz. superstition, witchcraft, sorcery and belief of people on casting spells and summoning evil spirits to take girls into possession which leads to murdering of innocent people falsely accused of practicing black magic.

Plot
Akash, a doctor by profession, is transferred to a village. After a sequence of unnatural incidents his wife, Riya becomes possessed by an evil spirit. Akash takes help from psychiatrist Doctor Rajiv and tries to discover reasons behind the incidents and his wife's possession. He tries to bring his wife, Riya, out of possession of an evil spirit and that's when he learns about Ravi and Anusuya who belonged to the village and loved each other. The villagers killed Anusuya suspecting her of practicing witchcraft.

Track list 
 Soniya Soniya
 Rangabati
 Priya Re
 Dara Lage

References

External links

Indian horror films
Indian 3D films
2010s Odia-language films
2013 horror films
2013 films
2013 3D films